Alireza Azizi (14 January 1949 – 7 August 2021) was an Iranian footballer who played as a midfielder.

Azizi was the second child in a family of five siblings. He started his professional career in Homa, where he would reach the third place in the Iranian league in 1975. Afterwards he changed to Persepolis F.C., where he would win the Iranian championship in 1976 and reach the runner-up position in 1977 and in 1978. After the Iranian Revolution he remained playing for Persepolis winning the Iranian nationwide tournament Espandi Cup before changing to Bank Melli F.C.

He was a member of the Iranian squad competing in the football tournament of the Olympic Tournament in Munich in 1972, winning the Asia Cup 1976 in Tehran and reaching the quarterfinals of the Olympic Tournament in Montreal in 1976.

Azizi died at the age of  72 on 7 August 2021.

Career statistics

International goals
Scores and results list Iran's goal tally first, score column indicates score after each Azizi goal.

References

External links

1949 births
2021 deaths
Homa F.C. players
Iranian footballers
Association football midfielders
Iran international footballers
Persepolis F.C. players
Olympic footballers of Iran
Footballers at the 1972 Summer Olympics
1976 AFC Asian Cup players
Footballers at the 1976 Summer Olympics
AFC Asian Cup-winning players
People from Abadan, Iran
Sportspeople from Khuzestan province